Dgebuadze was a Georgian noble family from the province of Mingrelia. In the 19th century, they served to the Dadiani princes of Mingrelia as governors (mouravi) of the canton of Salipartiano. According to the historian Cyril Toumanoff, they were accepted among the princely nobility of the Russian Empire in 1903.

References 

Noble families of Georgia (country)
Russian noble families
Georgian-language surnames